"I'll Be There" is a song written and originally recorded by Bobby Darin in 1960. It was first released as B-side to his single "Bill Bailey" (ATCO 6167). As such it entered the Billboard charts on July 11, 1960, and reached position 79.

Gerry and the Pacemakers recording
First recorded in 1963, on the Laurie label. Invariably used as the epilogue song at The Cavern Club, it became a Canadian number one hit for one of its bands, Gerry and the Pacemakers. (The US and UK singles were different recordings.)

Chart performance

Other cover versions
Elvis Presley recorded a cover version in early 1969. The song was released in April 1970 as the first track on side two of Presley's LP Let's Be Friends. The song features many big band arrangements and an extended jazzy instrumental section. The track runs 2:21.
Cissy Houston (a 1970 single)
Cass Elliot, on her album Cass Elliot (1972).

Use in other media
The song was performed by Daveigh Chase in the episode, "D.I.V.O.R.C.E.", of the television series Big Love.

References

External links
secondhandsongs.com Bobby Darin: I'll Be There

Songs written by Bobby Darin
Gerry and the Pacemakers songs
RPM Top Singles number-one singles
1965 singles
Song recordings produced by George Martin
Elvis Presley songs
Cissy Houston songs
Pop ballads
1960s ballads
Cass Elliot songs
1960 songs
Capitol Records singles
Columbia Graphophone Company singles
Laurie Records singles